"Patapan" (or "Pat-a-pan") is a French Christmas carol in Burgundian dialect, later adapted into English. It was written by Bernard de La Monnoye (1641–1728) and first published in Noël bourguignons in 1720. Its original title is "Guillô, Pran Ton Tamborin" ("Willie, Bring Your Little Drum" or "Willie, Take Your Little Drum").

The carol revolves around the birth of Jesus Christ, and is told from the perspective of shepherds playing simple instruments—flutes and drums—the onomatopoeic sound of which gives the song its name; "patapan" is meant to mimic the sound of the drum, and an accompanying lyric, "tu-re-lu-re-lu," the flute.  This is similar conceptually to the carol "The Little Drummer Boy", with its chorus of "pa-rum-pa-pum-pum."

Burgundian lyrics

French lyrics

English lyrics 
Willie, bring your little drum, Robin take your flute and come! 
When we hear the music bright we will sing Noel this night,
When we hear the fife and drum, Christmas should be frolicsome.

Thus the men of olden days for the King of Kings to praise, 
When they heard the fife and drum, tu-re-lu-re-lu, pat-a-pat-a-pan,
When they hear the fife and drum, sure, our children won't be dumb.

God and man are now become more at one than fife and drum. 
When you hear the fife and drum, tu-re-lu-re-lu, pat-a-pat-a-pan, 
When you hear the fife and drum, dance and make the village hum.

English rhyming version (Patta-Patta-Pan, Turra-Lurra-Lay, Wisconsin, U.S.) 
Billy, bring your new red drum,
Robby [Robin], get your fife and come
Fife and drum together play,
Patta-patta-pan, turra-lurra-lay,
Fife and drum together play,
On this joyous Holiday

When the men of olden days
To the King of Kings gave praise,
On the fife and drum did play,
Patta-patta-pan, turra-lurra-lay,
On the fife and drum did play,
So their hearts were glad and gay

There is music in the air
You can hear it everywhere,
Fife and drum together play,
Patta-patta-pan, turra-lurra-lay,
Fife and drum together play,
On this joyous Holiday

God and man today become
More in tune than fife and drum,
Fife and drum together play,
Patta-patta-pan, turra-lurra-lay,
Fife and drum together play,
On this joyous Holiday

See also
 List of Christmas carols
 Too Ra Loo Ra Loo Ral (also known as "Toora Loora")
 Celtic Thunder ("Toora Loora Lay")
 Patapan - Musikgruppe - www.Patapan.de

References

Christmas carols
French-language Christmas carols